Amanda Ray Beard (born October 29, 1981), also known by her married name Amanda Brown, is an American swimmer and a seven-time Olympic medalist (two gold, four silver, one bronze).  She is a former world record holder in the 200-meter breaststroke (long course).

Beard's success has earned her the American Swimmer of the Year Award twice.  She has won a total of twenty-one medals in major international competition, five gold, thirteen silver, and three bronze spanning the Olympics, the World Championships, the Pan Pacific Championships, and the Summer Universiade.

Career

1996 Summer Olympics

At the age of 14, Beard made her inaugural Olympic appearance at the 1996 Summer Olympics in Atlanta, when a student at Irvine High School in Irvine, California. She was often photographed clutching her teddy bear, even on the medal stand. Beard has the distinction of being the second-youngest American Olympic medalist when she won three medals—a gold and two silvers.

2000–2003

At the 2000 Summer Olympics in Sydney, Australia, Beard won a bronze medal in the 200-meter breaststroke.

Beard attended the University of Arizona, where she competed for the Arizona Wildcats swimming and diving team.  She won an individual NCAA Division I championship in 2001.  In 2003, she became the world champion and American record-holder in the 200-meter breaststroke.

2004 Summer Olympics

At the 2004 U.S. Olympic Swim Trials, she qualified to participate in four events at the 2004 Summer Olympics and broke the world record in the 200-meter breaststroke. She would win a gold medal in the 200-meter breaststroke. Beard also won silver in both the 200-meter individual medley and the 4×100-meter medley relay. Her split in the medley relay was the fastest out of the eight competing (1:06.32).

2008 Summer Olympics

At the 2008 U.S. Olympic Swim Trials, Beard finished second in the 200-meter breaststroke event, and she qualified for her fourth consecutive Olympics. On July 30, 2008, at the U.S. swimming team's final training in Singapore, Beard, together with Dara Torres and Natalie Coughlin, were elected co-captains of the U.S. Olympic women's swimming team.

In Beijing, Beard failed to reach the semi-finals in the 200-meter breaststroke, placing 18th in the preliminaries.

2010 U.S. Swimming Nationals
In August 2010, she came out of retirement to compete at the 2010 Conoco Phillips National Championships.  She finished second in the 200-meter breaststroke finals at 2:26.50, qualifying her for the Pan Pac team to represent the United States later in the month.

In the 100-meter breaststroke, Amanda Beard swam a 1:08.72 in prelims and 1:09.12 in finals, finishing 6th.

After the U.S. Nationals, Beard and Natalie Coughlin were nominated co-captains of U.S. national team once again. During the Pan Pacific Swimming Championships, Amanda Beard signed up for her two signature events, the 100- and the 200-meter breaststroke.
Beard qualified for finals in both events, but failed to medal. She was fifth in the 100-meter breaststroke (1:07.49) and fifth in the 200-meter breaststroke (2:24.30).

2012 Summer Olympics
Beard failed to qualify for the 2012 Olympic team after finishing 5th in the 200-meter breaststroke at the Olympic swimming trials.

Modeling and advertising

Her modeling work has included appearances in FHM, the 2006 Sports Illustrated Swimsuit Edition, and the July 2007 issue of Playboy magazine, in which she posed nude.

She is a spokeswoman for Defenders of Wildlife, and enjoys interior decorating. Both of her sisters, Leah and Taryn, are swimmers. Amanda placed eighth in the Toyota Grand Prix of Long Beach Celebrity car race in 2006.

In November 2007, Beard made her first television commercial for GoDaddy entitled "Shock". It featured her "flashing" the seven Olympic medals she won from 1996 to 2004. Mark Spitz made a cameo appearance.

In April 2008, she joined Fox Network's popular sports talk program, The Best Damn Sports Show Period as a correspondent, covering major sporting events.

In 2008, Beard participated in an anti-fur campaign for the organization People for the Ethical Treatment of Animals (PETA). She was photographed semi-nude (again covering her breasts and not exposing her nipples) in front of an American flag. The flag in that photograph is hung incorrectly according to the United States Flag Code with the blue field (canton) to the upper right. Shortly after the PETA campaign was released, accusations of hypocrisy surfaced.  Beard had told a fashion blogger the year before that her favorite shoes were leather sandals, and she had stated during an interview with SmartMoney magazine that she would never buy a low-quality leather jacket.

Personal life
Beard is a vegetarian. She reports a case of mild dyslexia, which caused trouble with grades in school. She is married to photographer Sacha Brown. On September 15, 2009, she gave birth to their first child, a boy named Blaise Ray Brown. Their daughter, Doone Isla Brown, was born on June 19, 2013.

Body dysmorphia
After achieving an athletic scholarship to the University of Arizona, Beard began to struggle with body dysmorphia disorder. Stress from wearing a swimsuit in front of others as well as seeing the photo-shopping process of her ads caused Beard to desire having a body which matched that in her photos. Beard has said that "even if it had hurt my swimming, I wouldn't have stopped. I wanted to be a great swimmer, but more than that, I wanted to be pretty, skinny, and perfect."

Autobiography
Beard released an autobiography on April 3, 2012, entitled In the Water They Can't See You Cry: A Memoir. She explains the title's significance as the sensation of putting her face in the water while swimming to hide any tears she shed into her goggles. The book cites her parents' divorce at the age of 12 as the beginning of her personal struggles, as well as her perfectionist nature. In the memoir, Beard chronicles struggles with self-mutilation, depression and drug use. She credits her husband with encouraging her to seek therapy.

Personal bests
Beard's personal bests in long-course meters are:
 100 m breaststroke: 1:07.42, 2003 World Aquatics Championships
 200 m breaststroke: 2:22.44, 2004 U.S. Olympic Swimming Trials 2004
 200 m individual medley: 2:11.70, 2004 Summer Olympics

Bibliography
 Beard, Amanda with Rebecca Paley. In the Water They Can't See You Cry: A Memoir. New York, Simon & Schuster, April 3, 2012. .

See also

 List of Olympic medalists in swimming (women)
 List of University of Arizona people
 List of World Aquatics Championships medalists in swimming (women)
 World record progression 200 metres breaststroke

References

External links 

 
 
 
 
 
 

1981 births
American female breaststroke swimmers
American female medley swimmers
Arizona Wildcats women's swimmers
Female models from California
Living people
Medalists at the 1996 Summer Olympics
Medalists at the 2000 Summer Olympics
Medalists at the 2004 Summer Olympics
Medalists at the FINA World Swimming Championships (25 m)
Olympic bronze medalists for the United States in swimming
Olympic gold medalists for the United States in swimming
Olympic silver medalists for the United States in swimming
Sportspeople from Irvine, California
Sportspeople from Newport Beach, California
Swimmers at the 1996 Summer Olympics
Swimmers at the 2000 Summer Olympics
Swimmers at the 2004 Summer Olympics
Swimmers at the 2008 Summer Olympics
Universiade medalists in swimming
Universiade silver medalists for the United States
World Aquatics Championships medalists in swimming
World record setters in swimming
Medalists at the 1999 Summer Universiade